Milton the Monster, also called The Milton the Monster Show, is an American Saturday morning animated cartoon TV series that ran on ABC from October 9, 1965, to September 8, 1968. It was produced and directed by Hal Seeger.

Overview
The series starred Milton the Monster, a Frankenstein-looking monster with a flat-topped, seemingly hollow head which emitted various quantities of white steam or smoke based on his mood or situation. He was created by mad scientist Professor Montgomery Weirdo and his assistant Count Kook, who lived in a haunted house on Horror Hill. Milton is a smiling, good-natured fellow, thanks to the Professor having used too much "tincture of tenderness" as explained in the opening theme of each individual Milton the Monster segment.  Milton was created not of individual body parts, but rather in a mold from such liquids as "essence of terror" and "sinister sauce."  Out of fear of his creation destroying him, Professor Weirdo intended to add just a touch of the aforementioned tincture of tenderness to the mold, but Count Kook bumped the Professor's elbow, resulting in too much of the tincture being added to the mix. Milton's voice, which was based on the southern accent used by Jim Nabors in his television role as Gomer Pyle, was provided by Bob McFadden who also provided voices for Professor Weirdo's resident monsters:

Heebie - a skull-faced, top hat-wearing ghoul with a Peter Lorre voice
Jeebie - a slow-witted, cyclopian, hairy green creature with a single sharp tooth that was often used to open soda cans

Professor Weirdo's nemesis was Professor Fruitcake, another mad scientist who lived in a castle on an opposite hill. Professor Fruitcake's major creation was Zelda the Zombie. Other characters in the series included Fangenstein, a biker monster apparently inspired by Marlon Brando, his sidekick Abercrombie the Zombie, and Professor Weirdo's aunt, the witchy Aunt Hagatha.

Other features
Other features on the show included:

 Fearless Fly, starring an insect superhero similar to Hanna-Barbera's Atom Ant. One of the most popular segments of the Milton the Monster Show, Fearless Fly was, in reality, Hiram, an ordinary housefly. When danger threatens, he ducks into a nearby matchbox, dons a red sweater and changes into the superhero Fearless Fly by, in a reversal of Clark Kent, putting on a pair of super high-powered glasses. Fearless Fly, according to the opening, is more powerful than a speeding rocket and faster than a beam of light. No flyswatter can harm him, no flypaper can hold him and no insecticide can stop him. Fearless Fly's sole weakness is losing his glasses, which happens in most of the episodes. His chief nemesis is the 900-year-old Dr. Fu Manchu-inspired Dr. Goo Fee and his assistant, Gung Ho. Occasionally, Milton the Monster'''s Professor Weirdo makes an appearance to threaten Fearless Fly. Usually, Bob McFadden does the voices, such as the seductive Lady Deflyah.
 Flukey Luke, with a cowboy detective, his Irish-accented Native American companion, Two Feathers and his horse, Pronto. Flukey Luke was so named because of his dumb luck that allowed him to get the upper hand, despite being incredibly inept.
 Stuffy Durma the Millionaire Hobo, starring a nouveau-riche hobo who resisted the attempts of valet Bradley Brinkley to get some culture and breeding.
 Muggy-Doo Boy Fox, featuring a sly boy fox who often gets into trouble with his get-rich-quick schemes.
 Penny Penguin, starring a bratty penguin girl and her parents.

Voice cast
Principal characters and voices:
 Bob McFadden: Milton the Monster, Fearless Fly, Professor Weirdo, Heebie, Jeebie, Professor Fruitcake
 Dayton Allen: Flukey Luke, Stuffy Durma, Bradley Brinkley, Chester Penguin, Two Feathers
 Herb Duncan: Muggy Doo
 Beverly Arnold: Penny Penguin, Flora Fly
 Hettie Galen: Beulah Penguin

Episode list
Episode 1
Fearless Fly: Trick or Treatment
Flukey Luke: Loot Pursuit
Milton the Monster: Zelda the Zombie

Episode 2
Fearless Fly: Horse Shoo Fly
Muggy Doo: Gogh Van Gogh
Milton the Monster: Boy Meets Ghoul

Episode 3
Fearless Fly: Fatty Karate
Muggy Doo: You Auto Be in Pictures
Milton the Monster: Monsters for Hire

Episode 4
Fearless Fly: Captain Fligh
Muggy Doo: Muggy Doo or Die
Milton the Monster: Who Do Voodoo?

Episode 5
Fearless Fly: The Goofy Dr. Goo Fee
Muggy Doo: From Riches to Rags
Milton the Monster: The Pot Thickens

Episode 6
Fearless Fly: Sly Fly
Stuffy Durma: From Wrecks to Riches
Milton the Monster: Medium Undone

Episode 7
Fearless Fly: Throne for a Loss
Flukey Luke: Missin' Masters
Milton the Monster: Monster Mutiny

Episode 8
Fearless Fly: The Bomb's Rush
Penny Penguin: There Auto Be a Law
Milton the Monster: Ghoul School

Episode 9
Fearless Fly: Fly Hijack
Flukey Luke: Tired Gun
Milton the Monster: Hector the Protector

Episode 10
Fearless Fly: Si Si Fly
Flukey Luke: Palace Malice
Milton the Monster: Horrorbaloo

Episode 11
Fearless Fly: The House-Fly Guest
Muggy Doo: Fortune Kooky
Milton the Monster: Goon Platoon

Episode 12
Fearless Fly: Invincible vs. Invisible
Stuffy Durma: Suit Yourself
Milton the Monster: The Dummy Talks

Episode 13
Fearless Fly: Fly by Might
Snuffy Durma: Hobo Hootenanny
Milton the Monster: A Pie in the Sky

Episode 14
Fearless Fly: The Sphinx Jinx
Penny Penguin: Penny Ante
Milton the Monster: Monstrous Escape

Episode 15
Fearless Fly: The Spider Spitter
Penny Penguin: Sickened Honeymoon
Milton the Monster: Abercrombie the Zombie

Episode 16
Fearless Fly: Fearless Fly Meets the Monsters (pilot)
Muggy Doo: Crumb-Bumming
Milton the Monster: V for Vampire

Episode 17
Milton the Monster: Monster vs. Mobster
Fearless Fly: Martians Meet their Match (pilot)
Milton the Monster: Witch Crafty

Episode 18
Milton the Monster: Camp Gitchy Gloomy
Fearless Fly: Let's Phase It
Milton the Monster: The Hearse Thief

Episode 19
Milton the Monster: Boo to You
Fearless Fly: Under Waterloo
Milton the Monster: Kid Stuff

Episode 20
Milton the Monster: Horror Scope
Fearless Fly: Lady Deflyah
Milton the Monster: The Flying Cup & Saucer

Episode 21
Milton the Monster: Monster-Sitter
Fearless Fly: Robinson Shoesole
Milton the Monster: The Moon Goons

Episode 22
Milton the Monster: Think Shrink
Fearless Fly: Private Fly
Milton the Monster: Skullgaria Forever!

Episode 23
Milton the Monster: Crumby Mummy
Fearless Fly: Stage Plight
Milton the Monster: Fort Fangenstein

Episode 24
Fearless Fly: Safari Harry
Stuffy Durma: Nuggets to You
Milton the Monster: Batnap

Episode 25
Milton the Monster: Dunkin' Treasure
Fearless Fly: Ferocious Fly
Milton the Monster: Monstrous Monster

Episode 26
Fearless Fly: Napoleon Bonafly
Flukey Luke: Violin Violence
Milton the Monster: The Mummy's Thumb

DVD release
On March 20, 2007, Shout! Factory released the complete series on a 4-DVD set.

See alsoBatfinkFurther reading
Kevin Scott Collier. Milton the Monster : Horror Hill Epitaph''. CreateSpace Independent Publishing Platform, 2018.

References

External links
 
Cartoon-O-Rama Spotlight on: The Milton the Monster Show
Milton the Monster at Nostalgia Central
Ron Kurer's Toontracker: Milton the Monster
Milton the Monster at Shout! Factory

1960s American animated television series
1965 American television series debuts
1968 American television series endings
American Broadcasting Company original programming
American children's animated comedy television series
American children's animated horror television series
Television series by Disney–ABC Domestic Television
Animated television series about monsters